Kibo, is a motor yacht built in 2014 by Abeking & Rasmussen. She was owned by Russian billionaire Alexander Mamut, but was sold in 2018 to John Reece and renamed Grace.

Design
Grace'''s exterior and interior were designed by Terence Disdale. The hull is built of steel and the superstructure is made of aluminium, with teak laid decks. The yacht is Lloyd's registered, issued by Cayman Islands. Grace is  shorter than her sister ship Romea.

Amenities
Zero speed stabilizers, elevator, beach club, grand piano, swimming platform, tender garage with tender, air conditioning, underwater lights.

Performance
She is powered by twin 2,000hp Caterpillar 3516-B diesel engines.

See also
 Romea Luxury yacht
 List of motor yachts by length List of yachts built by Abeking & Rasmussen''

References 

2014 ships
Motor yachts